David T. Walker (born June 25, 1941) is an American guitarist, born in Tulsa, Oklahoma. In addition to numerous session musician duties since the early 1970s, Walker has issued fifteen albums in his own name.

Career
David T. Walker was born to a Native American mother and African American father. He and his family relocated to Central California when he was 7 years old. He attended David Starr Jordan High School in the Watts area of Los Angeles.  He has recorded fifteen solo albums since his debut release, The Sidewalk, in 1967.  He has also been a session rhythm and lead guitarist, appearing on numerous soul, funk, and jazz releases. His backup work was featured on several notable albums of the early 1970s, including Stevie Wonder's Innervisions; Marvin Gaye's Let's Get It On and I Want You; Carole King's Rhymes & Reasons and Fantasy; The Jackson 5's Diana Ross Presents The Jackson 5, ABC, and Maybe Tomorrow, single "Never Can Say Goodbye"(1971); Michael Jackson's Ben, single "Got To Be There"(1971); Nick De Caro album "Italian Graffiti", song "Under the Jamican Moon"(1974), and Quincy Jones's Body Heat. He also played with the combo Afrique on its 1973 Afro funk release Soul Makossa.

Other musicians Walker has worked with over the years include James Brown (1973), Ray Charles, Nick De Caro, Etta James, Aretha Franklin, Smokey Robinson, Jack Stratton, Martha and the Vandellas, Four Tops, Diana Ross, Gladys Knight & the Pips, Billy Preston, Bobby Womack(1981), Barry White & Love Unlimited Orchestra, Hampton Hawes, Herbie Hancock, Lou Rawls, Willie Hutch, Jeffrey Osborne, Johnny Bristol, Solomon Burke, Cannonball Adderley, B.B. King, Pharoah Sanders, The Crusaders, Joe Sample, Sarah Vaughan, Sérgio Mendes, Freddie Hubbard, Stanley Turrentine, Gerald Levert, and Boz Scaggs.

His song "On Love" was sampled on the breakbeat compilation album Tribe Vibes Vol. 2 by the group A Tribe Called Quest. His guitar riff on Joe Sample's "In All My Wildest Dreams" (from Rainbow Seeker) was sampled on Tupac Shakur's song "Dear Mama".

Walker played in Bill Cosby's all-star band at the 2008 Playboy Jazz Festival.

He has gained popularity in Japan for playing guitar and he also leads his group on tours of Japan each year. He recently toured Japan with Marlena Shaw, Larry Carlton and a Brazilian artist Ed Motta. His earlier albums have found new life by being reissued in Japanese editions, along with "best of" collections. An album titled Thoughts was released in Japan in 2008. A holiday album titled Wear My Love was released in Japan in 2009. For All Time was released in 2010.

Discography

As Leader
 The Sidewalk (1967) Revue RS-7207
 Going Up! (1969) Revue RS-7211
 Plum Happy (1970) Zea ZLP-1000
 David T. Walker (1971) Ode Ode SP-77011
 Press On (1973) Ode SP-77020
 On Love (1976) Ode SP-77035
 Swing Street Cafe (with Joe Sample, 1981) Crusaders/MCA CRP-16004; Crusaders/MCA CRPD-5785
 Y-Ence (1987) The Baked Potato BPL-28005; Half Moon 28XE-3; Alfa Moon 32XM-35
 With A Smile (1988) The Baked Potato BPL-28006; Half Moon	28XE-4; Alfa Moon 32XM-69
 Ahimsa (1989) Half Moon 28XE-2
 Soul Food Cafe (with Soul Food Cafe, 1989) Invitation VDR-1636
 ...From My Heart (1993) Edoya EDCP-602; BMG BVCM-35165
 Dream Catcher (1994) Edoya EDCP-701; BMG BVCM-35166
 Beloved (1995) Edoya EDCP-25005; BMG BVCM-35167
 David T. Walker 1971-1976: Best of Best (2008) Video Arts Music VACZ-1365 (Japan)
 Thoughts (2008) DCT Records UPCH-20113 (Japan)
 Wear My Love (Christmas album, 2009) DCT Records UPCH-20176 (Japan)
 For All Time (2010) DCT Records XQJS-1002 (Japan)
 @ Billboard Live, Tokyo (with Larry Carlton, 2015) 335 Records 335-1507
 Music For Your Heart: Best of David T. Walker (2017) Universal Music UCCR-1064 (Japan)

As sideman
With Etta James
 Etta James Rocks the House (Argo, 1963)
With Martha & The Vandellas
 Martha & The Vandellas LIVE (Gordy, 1967)
With Stevie Wonder
 Where I'm Coming From (Tamla, 1971)
 Innervisions (Tamla, 1973)
With The Jackson 5
 Diana Ross Presents The Jackson 5 (Motown, 1969)
 ABC (Motown, 1970)
 Third Album (Motown, 1970)
 The Jackson 5 Christmas Album (Motown, 1970)
 Maybe Tomorrow (Motown, 1971)
 Lookin' Through the Windows (Motown, 1972)
 Skywriter (Motown, 1973)
 G.I.T.: Get It Together (Motown, 1973)
 Dancing Machine (Motown, 1974)
 Joyful Jukebox Music (Motown, 1976)
With Afrique
 Soul Makossa (Mainstream, 1973)

With Marvin Gaye
 Trouble Man (Tamla, 1972)
 Let's Get It On (Tamla, 1973)
 Marvin Gaye Live! (Tamla, 1974)
 I Want You (Tamla, 1976)
With Cannonball Adderley
 The Happy People (Capitol, 1970)
With Donald Byrd
 Ethiopian Knights (Blue Note, 1971)
 Black Byrd (Blue Note, 1972)
 Street Lady (Blue Note, 1973)
 Stepping into Tomorrow (Blue Note, 1974)
 Caricatures (Blue Note, 1976)
With Nick De Caro
 Italian Graffiti (Blue Thumb, 1974)

With Friends of Distinction
 Reviviscence (RCA, 1975)
With Herbie Hancock
 Man-Child (Columbia, 1975)
With Monk Higgins
 Heavyweight (UA, 1972)
With Richard "Groove" Holmes
 Six Million Dollar Man,  (RCA/Flying Dutchman, 1975)
With Freddie Hubbard
 Bundle of Joy (Columbia, 1977)
 Splash (Fantasy, 1981)
With Bobbi Humphrey
 Blacks and Blues (Blue Note, 1973)
With Paul Humphrey
 Paul Humphrey & the Cool Aid Chemists (Lizad, 1969)
With Quincy Jones
 Dollar$ (Reprise, 1971)
 Body Heat (A&M, 1974)
 Roots (A&M, 1977)
With Lonette McKee
 Lonette (Sussex, 1978)
With Blue Mitchell
Stratosonic Nuances (RCA, 1975)
The Last Tango = Blues (Mainstream, 1973)
With Alphonse Mouzon
 The Man Incognito (Blue Note, 1975)
With Jeffrey Osborne
 Jeffrey Osborne (A&M, 1982)
With Gloria Scott
 What Am I Gonna Do (Casablanca, 1974)
With Marlena Shaw
 Who Is This Bitch, Anyway? (Blue Note, 1974)
With The Silvers
 The Silvers II (Pride, 1973)
With Stanley Turrentine
 Pieces of Dreams (Fantasy, 1974)
 In the Pocket (Fantasy, 1975)
 Have You Ever Seen the Rain (Fantasy, 1975)
 Betcha (Elektra, 1979)
 La Place (Blue Note, 1989)
With Vulfpeck
 Christmas in L.A. (Single) (Vulf Records, 2014)
 Thrill of the Arts  (Vulf Records, 2015)
 Game Winner  (Vulf Records, 2016)
 Running Away (Vulf Records, 2017)
 Grandma (Vulf Records, 2017)
 Never Can Say Goodbye (Vulf Records, 2022)

With Leon Ware
 Musical Message (Gordy, 19)
With Bobby Womack
 The Poet (Beverly Glen, 1981)
With Dee Dee Bridgewater
 Just Family (Elektra, 1977)
With Ed Motta
 AOR (Dwitza, 2013)

See also
 Barry White

References

External links
 
 Billboard website
 Discogs website

American soul guitarists
American male guitarists
American session musicians
1941 births
Living people
Musicians from Tulsa, Oklahoma
Guitarists from Oklahoma
20th-century American guitarists
20th-century American male musicians
Revue Records artists
Ode Records artists
The Love Unlimited Orchestra members